The Blackdown Rings are the earthworks of an Iron Age hill fort near the hamlet of Hazelwood in Devon, England.

References

Hill forts in Devon